The 1912 Wabash Little Giants football team represented the Wabash College during the 1912 college football season. Under 4th year head coach Jesse Harper, the Little Giants compiled 5–2 record, and outscored their opponents by a total of 261 to 65.

Schedule

References

Wabash
Wabash Little Giants football seasons
Wabash Little Giants football